La Paz is one of the seven districts of Iloilo City in the Philippine province of Iloilo, on the island of Panay, in the region of Western Visayas. It is the third-largest district by land area, after Jaro and Mandurriao. According to the 2020 census, it has a population of 54,720 people. It was formerly known as Ilawod or "sea/wet land" together with Jaro which was referred to as Ilaya or "mountain/dry land".

It is known as the origin place of the popular Filipino noodle soup dish, La Paz Batchoy.

The La Paz District Plaza, also known simply as the La Paz Park in Iloilo, is the largest of the city's six district plazas. It features a large football field where games are held on occasion. In front of the plaza is a red-brick church, La Paz Church.

History 
La Paz was established in 1584 as one of the barrios of the town of Jaro, named Bagong Banera. It was only in 1856 that it was separated from Jaro and established as a pueblo (town) named Lobo. It was later renamed to La Paz, which translates from Spanish as "peace", is derived from its patron saint, Nuestra Señora de la Paz y Buen Viaje in Spanish; in English, Our Lady of Peace and Good Voyage.

On July 16, 1937, La Paz was incorporated as a district of Iloilo City, along with the towns of Arevalo, Mandurriao, and Molo.

In 2008, La Paz's sub-district of Lapuz was separated after the city council approved a resolution for its independence in order to have a separate police and fire stations.

Culture

La Paz Batchoy 
The La Paz Public Market in the district is often referred to as the specific birthplace of the Ilonggo noodle soup dish, La Paz Batchoy. It is a noodle soup made with pork offal, crushed pork cracklings, chicken stock, beef loin and round noodles.

La Paz Fiesta 
In honor of the district patron saint of La Paz, Nuestra Señora de la Paz y Buen Viaje (Our Lady of Peace and Good Voyage), La Paz Fiesta, or the Feast of the Our Lady of Peace and Good Voyage, is held annually in the district on May 24.

Barangays 
La Paz district has 25 barangays.

Education 
La Paz is home to two of the eight universities in Iloilo City, namely, West Visayas State University and Iloilo Science and Technology University. Other notable schools in the district are Western Institute of Technology, St. Therese – MTC Colleges, Hua Siong College of Iloilo, and Iloilo National High School.

Transportation 
La Paz, like other districts of Iloilo City, is served mostly by passenger jeepneys, white metered taxis, and tricycles within the district. It is also the location of the headquarters of Panay Railways, which operated a railroad from Iloilo City to Roxas City from 1907 to the 1980s.

See also 

 Batchoy
 Panay Railways

References

External links

 Iloilo City Government Official Website

Districts of Iloilo City
Former municipalities of the Philippines
